Jack Healy (March 9, 1904 – July 14, 1972) was an American actor and the co-manager of boxer Rocky Graziano. He was best known for playing Pvt. Chet Mullen in The Phil Silvers Show. Healy died in July 1972 at his home in New York City, New York, at the age of 68.

Filmography

Film

Television

References

External links 

1972 deaths
1904 births
American male television actors
20th-century American male actors